In acid–base chemistry, homoassociation (an IUPAC term) is an association between a base and its conjugate acid through a hydrogen bond. The alternate  term homoconjugation also  has wide usage, but is ambiguous because it has another meaning in organic chemistry (see Conjugated system#Mechanism).

Most commonly, homoassociation leads to the enhancement of the acidity of an acid by itself. The effect is accentuated at high concentrations, i.e. the ionization of an acid varies nonlinearly with concentration.  This effect arises from the stabilization of the conjugate base by its formation of a hydrogen bond to the parent acid.  A well known case is hydrofluoric acid, which is a significantly stronger acid when concentrated than when dilute due to the following equilibria:
2 HF  H2F+  +  F−  (autoionization of HF)
HF + F−  HF2−  (homoassociation)
Overall:
3 HF  HF2− + H2F+
The bifluoride anion (HF2−) encourages the ionization of HF by stabilizing the F−.  Thus, the usual ionization constant for hydrofluoric acid (10−3.15) understates the acidity of concentrated solutions of HF.

The effect of homoassociation is often high in nonaqueous solutions, wherein dissociation is often low.  Carboxylic acids and phenols exhibit this effect, for example in sodium diacetate

References

Equilibrium chemistry
Acid–base chemistry